Anodonthyla theoi is a species of microhylidae frog. This species is native to Madagascar and can be found in lowland rain forests.

References

External links
 

Anodonthyla
Endemic frogs of Madagascar
Amphibians described in 2010